Hathliodes is a genus of longhorn beetles of the subfamily Lamiinae, containing the following species:

subgenus Hathliodes
 Hathliodes costulatus Pascoe, 1867
 Hathliodes fuscovittatus Breuning, 1940
 Hathliodes grammicus (Pascoe, 1859)
 Hathliodes moratus Pascoe, 1866
 Hathliodes persimilis Breuning, 1938
 Hathliodes virgatus Breuning, 1938

subgenus Trichohathlia
 Hathliodes pseudomurinus Breuning, 1938

References

Pteropliini